Erato voluta is a species of small sea snail, a marine gastropod mollusk in the family Triviidae, the false cowries or trivias.

Description

Distribution

References

External links

Eratoidae
Gastropods described in 1803